Many quantum mechanical Hamiltonians are time dependent. Methods to solve problems where there is an explicit time dependence is an open subject nowadays. It is important to look for constants of motion or invariants for problems of this kind. For the (time dependent) harmonic oscillator it is possible to write several invariants, among them, the Ermakov–Lewis invariant which is developed below.

The time dependent harmonic oscillator Hamiltonian reads

 
It is well known that an invariant for this type of interaction
has the form

 
where  obeys the Ermakov equation

The above invariant is the so-called Ermakov–Lewis invariant. It is easy to show that  may be related to
the time independent harmonic oscillator Hamiltonian via a unitary transformation of the
form 

as

This allows an easy form to express the solution of the Schrödinger equation for the time dependent Hamiltonian.

The first exponential in the transformation is the so-called squeeze operator.

This approach may allow to simplify problems such as the Quadrupole ion trap, where an ion is trapped in a harmonic potential with time dependent frequency. The transformation presented here is then useful to take into account such effects.

References

Quantum mechanics